Tenango de Doria is a town and one of the 84 municipalities of Hidalgo, in central-eastern Mexico. The municipality covers an area of 210.7 km².

As of 2020, the municipality had a total population of 17,503. In 2017 there were 5,030 inhabitants who spoke an indigenous language, primarily Sierra Otomi and Nahuatl.

References 

Municipalities of Hidalgo (state)
Populated places in Hidalgo (state)